Effingham County Courthouse may refer either of two former courthouses:

Old Effingham County Courthouse, Springfield, Georgia
Effingham County Cultural Center and Museum, Effingham, Illinois